Maryinskaya is a rural locality (a village) in Yavengskoye Rural Settlement, Vozhegodsky District, Vologda Oblast, Russia. The population was 138 as of 2002.

Geography 
Maryinskaya is located 18 km southwest of Vozhega (the district's administrative centre) by road. Perepechikha is the nearest rural locality.

References 

Rural localities in Vozhegodsky District